Events from the year 1164 in Ireland.

Incumbents
High King: Muirchertach Mac Lochlainn

Events

The abbey in Terryglass was burned down

Deaths
Mael Sechlainn mac Congalaig, King of Uí Failghe

References

 
1160s in Ireland
Ireland
Years of the 12th century in Ireland